Bombardier may refer to:

Armed forces
 Bombardier (rank), rank equivalent to corporal used in some artillery corps
 Bombardier (aircrew), crew member on a bomber aircraft
 Artillery crewman, archaically

Businesses
 Bombardier Inc., a company mainly specializing in air and railway vehicles
 Bombardier Aviation, the aircraft division  
 Bombardier Transportation, the defunct railway equipment division
 Bombardier Recreational Products, a manufacturer of snowcats and snowmobiles, part of Bombardier Inc. until 2003

People
 Bombardier Billy Wells, English heavyweight boxer
 Charles Bombardier (born 1974), Canadian industrial designer and entrepreneur
 Joseph-Armand Bombardier (1907–1964), Canadian inventor and businessman, founder of Bombardier Inc.
 Denise Bombardier (born 1941), Canadian journalist
 Jean-Michel Bombardier (born 1970), Canadian skater

Others
 Bombardier (film), a 1943 film about aircrew training, starring Pat O'Brien, Randolph Scott, Robert Ryan and Eddie Albert
 Bombardier beetle, insect of family Carabidae  
 Bombardier Bitter, a beer brewed by Marston's in England